The fourth series of the children's British cooking programme Matilda and the Ramsay Bunch which began airing from 24 April 2018 on CBBC and finished on 31 July 2018. It was announced in June 2017 that CBBC had renewed the show for a fourth series which will air in 2018. The fourth series will follow the same format as the past three series where we will see the Ramsay family on their summer holidays, all of the Ramsay family will return. The series returned to airing later in the day unlike the third series which aired in the mornings.

Production

Development
During broadcast of the third series, it was announced that the show was renewed for a fourth series which is due to air in summer 2018 on CBBC. The Ramsay family were seen filming in London at the 2017 Dragon boat festival. All the Ramsay's are expected to return for the fourth series. The series will go back to its usual time slot of 5:25pm and will run for 15x15 minute episodes. The fourth series will see the show return to Cornwall which wasn't featured in the third series due to the Ramsay Cornwall home being rebuilt.

Another change to the fourth series saw Ramsay family friends Emma and Byrom who had appeared as recurring cast members from the second series didn't return for the fourth series.

Filming
Filming for the fourth series began in June 2017 in London at the London dragon boat festival 2017.  All the Ramsay family will return for the fourth series. Filming also took place at the 2017 London Marathon were Megan Ramsay ran the Marathon. Filming also took place in Cornwall, the Ramsay family were seen filming with the RNLI.

For the first time the series went to Italy to film at the La Festa Italiana festival in 2017 also for the first time the series wasn't filmed in America where it's been filmed for the last three series.

Guest starring
The four series also had guest appearances from celebrities same as the past series.

Episodes

Ratings

References

External links
 
 

2018 British television seasons